James Kenneth Jackson (born February 1, 1960) is a Canadian former professional ice hockey right winger. He played for the Calgary Flames and the Buffalo Sabres of the National Hockey League between 1982 and 1988. He later coached the Markham Thunder of the Canadian Women's Hockey League.

Early life
Jackson was born to Ralph (Curly) Kenneth Jackson and Joan Thérèse Melvina Jackson (née Cardinal) in Oshawa, Ontario. He was the third of four children. Jackson started skating at the age of two, and his constructed a wooden frame in preparation for packing and flooding their large backyard rink every autumn.

As a youth, Jackson played in the 1972 and 1973 Quebec International Pee-Wee Hockey Tournaments with a minor ice hockey team from Oshawa.

Jackson played four years of junior hockey with the Oshawa Generals and the Niagara Falls Flyers of the Ontario Major Junior Hockey League between 1976 and 1980. He turned professional in 1980 when he joined the Richmond Rifles of the Eastern Hockey League. He moved to the Muskegon Mohawks of the International Hockey League the next season. The next 3 seasons were spent with the Calgary Flames of the National Hockey League (NHL), as well as with their minor league affiliates in Colorado and Moncton. In 1985, the Buffalo Sabres assigned Jim to the Rochester Americans of the American Hockey League.In 112 NHL games, Jim scored 17 goals and 47 points. With Rochester, he scored 93 goals and 205 assists in 360 games.

In 2001, Jackson was inducted into Rochester Americans Hockey Hall of Fame.   The following year, he was inducted into the Oshawa Sports Hall of Fame. In 1990, Jackson retired as a hockey player.

Awards
 Calder Cup Champion, Rochester Americans 1986-87
 Rochester Americans Hockey Hall of Fame, inducted 2001
 Oshawa Sports Hall of Fame, inducted 2002

Career statistics

Regular season and playoffs

Source: NHL.com

References

External links

Oshawa Sports Hall of Fame
Rochester Americans Hockey Hall of Fame

Bibliography

 

1960 births
Living people
Buffalo Sabres players
Calgary Flames players
Canadian ice hockey forwards
Ice hockey people from Ontario
Moncton Golden Flames players
Muskegon Mohawks players
Niagara Falls Flyers players
Oshawa Generals players
Richmond Rifles players
Rochester Americans players
Sportspeople from Oshawa
Undrafted National Hockey League players